The 2009 NORCECA Beach Volleyball Circuit at Jamaica was held June 26–29, 2009 in Kingston, Jamaica. It was the fourth leg of the NORCECA Beach Volleyball Circuit 2009.

Women's competition

Men's competition

References
 NORCECA
 BV Info (Archived 2009-08-01)

See also
 NORCECA Beach Volleyball Circuit 2009

Jamaica
Norceca Beach Volleyball Circuit (Jamaica), 2009
International volleyball competitions hosted by Jamaica